James Ben Ali Haggin III  (20 April 1882 – 2 September 1951) was an American portrait painter and stage designer.

Life
A grandson of the multi-millionaire James Ben Ali Haggin, he was born in New York City. After extensive education, he began exhibiting his paintings formally in 1903. The National Academy of Design awarded him the 1909 Third Hallgarten Prize for his painting Elfrida. A founding member of the National Association of Portrait Painters, he was elected an Associate member of the National Academy of Design from 1912. In the 1930s, Haggin turned his abilities to stage design and created sets for the Metropolitan Opera Ballet and the Ziegfeld Follies.

Haggin's family were of partial Turkish origin (one of his paternal great-grandfathers, Ibrahim Ben Ali, was a Turkish immigrant). He married Margaret Faith Robinson on 4 November 1903 at the Church of the Transfiguration, New York.

In 1914, several major events occurred in Haggin's life. He separated from his wife, and spent time in a sanitarium. His grandfather also died that year, and Haggin inherited a reputed $10 million from the estate. In 1916 he married Helen Roche, an actress and dancer who went by the stage name Bonnie Glass.

See also
National Red Cross Pageant (1917)
Haggin Museum

References

External links 

Ben Ali Haggin Papers held by the Jerome Lawrence and Robert E. Lee Theatre Research Institute, The Ohio State University Libraries.

20th-century American painters
American male painters
1882 births
1951 deaths
American people of Turkish descent
Painters from New York (state)
National Academy of Design associates
20th-century American male artists